Bandar Mahkota Cheras is a township in Cheras, Selangor, Malaysia. It was developed by Narajaya Sdn Bhd, a subsidiary of Lion Group. Construction commenced in late 1999 or early 2000 on a freehold plot of about 365 hectares. Mostly consisting of two-storey terraced houses, the population is estimated to be in excess of 50,000 in more than 10,000 households. There are also a few smaller developments by other developers in the same township, e.g., Cheras Vista and Pinggiran Mahkota Cheras. It is located in the mukim (sub-district) of Cheras, daerah (district) of Ulu Langat and state of Selangor. It is under the administration of local council Majlis Perbandaran Kajang (MPKj).

Amenities 

The main commercial center in the middle of the township, called the Mahkota Walk, has many clinics, restaurants, internet cafe, convenience shops, and hardware shops. A shopping complex, BMC Mall is there. A nursing college, Masterskill University College of Healthcare (currently known as Asean Metropoliton University) previously had its Physiotherapy division at the heart of Mahkota Walk, but has since closed its doors. Several banks have opened branches there. There is also a small recreation park opened for public.

Accessibility 

Mahkota Cheras can be accessed from Cheras-Kajang Highway exit via the Cheras Perdana interchange at 10th mile Cheras. Another access is from the SILK (Sistem Lingkaran Kajang) Highway exit via Bandar Sungai Long. In the township itself, there are two main dual carriageway roads, Persiaran Mahkota Cheras 1 and 2 running through BMC.

However, there is heavy traffic at the road exiting to the Cheras-Kajang Highway, especially during peak hours.

External links
BandarMahkotaCheras.com43200 Selangor Darul Ehsan

References

Townships in Selangor